Marion County is located in the U.S. state of Indiana. The 2020 United States census reported a population of 977,203, making it the largest county in the state and 51st most populated county in the country. Indianapolis is the county seat, the state capital, and largest city. Marion County is consolidated with Indianapolis through an arrangement known as Unigov.

Marion County is the central county of the Indianapolis–Carmel–Anderson MSA in Central Indiana.

Geography
The low rolling hills of Marion County have been cleared of trees, and the area is completely devoted to municipal development or to agriculture, except for wooded drainages. The highest point ( ASL) is a small ridge at the county's northwest corner.

The White River flows southwestward through the central part of the county; it is joined by Eagle Creek and Fall Creek, both of which have dams in the county forming Eagle Creek Reservoir and Geist Reservoir, respectively.

Marion County has two Indiana State Parks, Fort Harrison State Park and White River State Park, as well as many municipal parks.

Adjacent counties

 Hamilton County - north
 Hancock County - east
 Shelby County - southeast
 Johnson County - south
 Morgan County - southwest
 Hendricks County - west
 Boone County - northwest

Transportation

Major highways

 
 *
 
 
 
 
 
 
 
 
 
 
 
 
 

* I-69 currently ends in Indianapolis at the I-465 interchange in the northeast section of the county. The extension connecting Indianapolis and Evansville is expected to be completed in 2024.

Airports

 KIND - Indianapolis International Airport
 KEYE - Eagle Creek Airpark
 Post-Air Airport

History
Marion County was created on April 1, 1822, from part of the "New Purchase" lands that had been obtained from its inhabitants, the Lenape, by the Treaty of St. Mary's. It is named for Francis Marion, a brigadier general from South Carolina in the American Revolutionary War.

The state capital was moved to Indianapolis in Marion County from Corydon on January 10, 1825. This began a period of rapid growth in population.

Climate and weather

Demographics

2010 census
As of the 2010 U.S. census, there were 903,393 people, 366,176 households, and 218,338 families in the county. The racial makeup of the county was 62.7% white, 26.7% black or African American, 2.0% Asian, 0.3% American Indian, 0.1% Pacific islander, 5.4% from other races, and 2.8% from two or more races. Those of Hispanic or Latino origin made up 9.3% of the population. In terms of ancestry, 18.9% were German, 11.8% were Irish, 8.4% were English, 6.6% were American, and 5.2% were Subsaharan African.

Of the 366,176 households, 32.3% had children under the age of 18 living with them, 36.9% were married couples living together, 17.1% had a female householder with no husband present, 40.4% were non-families, and 32.0% of all households were made up of individuals. The average household size was 2.42 and the average family size was 3.08. The median age was 33.9 years.

The median income for a household in the county was $47,697 and the median income for a family was $54,142. Males had a median income of $42,215 versus $34,169 for females. The per capita income for the county was $24,498. About 13.5% of families and 17.3% of the population were below the poverty line, including 25.7% of those under age 18 and 9.0% of those age 65 or over.

Cities and towns
Marion County has a consolidated city-county government, known as Unigov, in which only four municipalities retain full government autonomy (including a mayor and city council) as "excluded cities". The remaining municipalities within the county are "included towns" and exercise very limited authority, mainly in zoning and appointing their own police departments and maintaining some of their own municipal services and town identities. They retain the ability to levy taxes for these purposes.

Municipalities
Excluded cities in bold.

 Beech Grove
 Clermont
 Crows Nest
 Cumberland (western portion)
 Homecroft
 Indianapolis
 Lawrence
 Meridian Hills
 North Crows Nest
 Rocky Ripple
 Southport
 Speedway
 Spring Hill
 Warren Park
 Williams Creek
 Wynnedale

Townships
Marion County has nine townships roughly organized into a grid-like, three-by-three pattern. This arrangement can be seen below, with the top being north.

Politics
Most of Marion County is in Indiana's 7th congressional district, which is held by Democrat André Carson. Indiana's 5th congressional district, which runs along the northern edge of the county, is held by Republican Victoria Spartz. The county is represented by 15 seats in the Indiana House of Representatives, 86th through 100th districts, with ten seats held by Democrats and five by Republicans. In the State Senate Marion County is divided among nine districts, which are held by two Democrats and seven Republicans. The Senate districts are numbered 28 through 36.

The Indianapolis City-County Council is the combined legislative body of Indianapolis and Marion County. The consolidated government, known as Unigov, was formally established in 1970 upon the merger of the city government with the county government. The council passes ordinances for the city and county, and makes appointments to certain boards and commissions.

County elected officials

 Mayor (County Executive): Joe Hogsett (D)
 Auditor: Julie Voorhies (D)
 Clerk: Myla A. Eldrige (D)
 Coroner: Dr. Lee Sloan (D)
 Assessor: Joseph P. O'Connor (D)
 Prosecutor: Ryan Mears (D)
 Recorder: Kate Sweeney Bell (D)
 Sheriff: Kerry J. Forestal (D)
 Surveyor: Debra S. Jenkins (D)
 Treasurer: Barbara A. Lawrence (D)

The Auditor, Assessor, and Treasurer form the county's Board of Commissioners.

For most of the 20th century, Marion County was considered one of the most conservative urban counties in the nation. Between 1896 and 2000, it went Democratic only four times, in the national landslides of 1932, 1936 and 1964 as well as 1912 when Woodrow Wilson won a plurality in the county. The Republican edge began to lessen considerably in the 1990s, and in 2004 John Kerry became the first Democrat since Lyndon B. Johnson in 1964 to carry the county. The trend continued in 2008 and 2012 with Barack Obama showing strongly in Marion County, winning 63% and 60% of the vote respectively. Hillary Clinton won it with 58 percent in 2016, and Joe Biden took 63 percent in 2020. Biden's 247,772 votes is the highest number of votes a candidate has ever received in the county. It is now one of the few Democratic bastions in traditionally heavily Republican central Indiana.

The six northern and central townships lean more Democratic, especially Center township containing Downtown Indianapolis, and Pike Township in the northwestern corner with an African-American majority. In contrast, the three less populated southern townships with a higher Caucasian population (Decatur, Perry and Franklin) lean more Republican.

Education
School districts include:
 Beech Grove City Schools
 Decatur Township Metropolitan School District
 Franklin Township Community School Corporation
 Indianapolis Public Schools
 Lawrence Township Metropolitan School District
 Perry Township Metropolitan School District
 Pike Township Metropolitan School District
 Speedway School Town
 Warren Township Metropolitan School District
 Washington Township Metropolitan School District
 Wayne Township Metropolitan School District

It also has the following state-operated schools:
 Indiana School for the Blind and Visually Impaired
 Indiana School for the Deaf

See also

 Marion County Fair (Indiana)
List of counties in Indiana

References

External links
 
 Indianapolis and Marion County Official Website
 Marion County Sheriff's Office Official Website
 Marion County InDepth Profile: STATS Indiana 
 County Highlights: Marion County: Hoosiers by the Numbers

 
1822 establishments in Indiana
Indiana counties
Indianapolis metropolitan area
Populated places established in 1822